Tongji may refer to:
Tongji Bridge (Jinhua) a large stone arch bridge in Jinhua, China.
Tongji Bridge (Yuyao) a stone arch bridge in Yuyao, China.
Tongji County, former name of Shifang, Sichuan, China.
Tongji Lu Station metro station in Foshan, China.
Tongji Medical College in Wuhan, China.
Tongji University, a university in Shanghai, China.
Tongji University Station, a metro in Shanghai, China.
Tongji, a form of Chinese shaman or oracle